Dog Faced Hermans were a post-punk band that formed in Scotland in the mid 1980s and remained active through the mid 1990s. They emerged from  the UK anarcho-punk scene with a guitar/bass/drums line-up, but also incorporated trumpet and other instruments not commonly found in punk music at that time. Their composition style incorporated many genres of music outside of rock, including folk, jazz, ambient and noise music with often unorthodox instrumentation.

History

1980s

Dog Faced Hermans formed in Edinburgh, Scotland out of the female-fronted funk-punk sextet Volunteer Slavery, named after an album by Rahsaan Roland Kirk. Londoner Andy Moor, who was studying anthropology in Edinburgh, first met Colin McLean at a benefit for the Scottish Campaign to Remove the Atomic Menace, and the two shared a love of James Brown, free jazz, reggae, and African music. McLean owned both a guitar and a bass, which he traded off with Moor, eventually setting on who was to play which in the band after realizing that the songs they liked best were the ones with McLean on bass and Moor on guitar. Wilf plum had been moonlighting with local noise bands Finitribe and Stretchheads, and Marion Coutts took time off from her studies at Edinburgh College of Art to play trumpet, and the whole group also took to banging on oil drums and other percussion.

Their band got their new name from a scene in a Frankenstein movie, "where a woman dreams that her husband, whose name is Herman, gets turned into a dog," although the phrase occurs in the 1933 horror The Vampire Bat. When the group started, they played primarily improvised music, "like bashing oil drums and hitting the guitars without actually playing very many tunes," according to drummer Wilf Plum. The group's longer improvisations were condensed into shorter arranged songs that maintained their experimental qualities. The Hermans' line-up stayed constant throughout their tenure, with Marion Coutts fronting the band on vocals, trumpet and percussion, Andy Moor on guitar, Colin Mclean on bass, and Wilf Plum on drums. Within their first three years as a band, the Hermans recorded and released a few singles and two albums on their own Demon Radge Records and on journalist Everett True’s label, Calculus. These early records demonstrated the breadth of the band's influences, including English and Scottish post-punk, American no wave, and various styles of folk music, exemplified in their renditions of the Italian partisan song "Bella Ciao" and the blues standard "John Henry".

While in the UK, the Dog Faced Hermans made numerous appearances on the BBC, recording three songs for The John Peel Show in 1987 and appearing on the TV programme FSD in 1988.

1990s

The group found affinity in Dutch anarchist group The Ex, whom they'd been introduced to through members of Chumbawamba. The Ex and Dog Faced Hermans toured Europe, the United States, and Canada together and released the single "Stonestamper's Song" under the name Ex Faced Hermans, a split live cassette, and began a longstanding collaboration with the free jazz ensemble Instant Composers Pool. The Dog Faced Hermans also served as the backing band for Kurdish musician Brader with whom The Ex had also collaborated. By 1990 the Dog Faced Hermans relocated to Amsterdam taking on The Ex's sound engineer Gert Jan as a member of the group, and in 1991 Andy Moor joined The Ex, and for some years played guitar for both bands.

The Hermans struck up a deal with the Dutch label Konkurrent for the release of 1991's Mental Blocks for All Ages and 1993's Hum of Life, which featured covers of songs by free jazz pioneer Ornette Coleman and American no wave group 8 Eyed Spy. Part of the lead track, "Jan 9", is lifted from the Rumanian folk tune "Rumelaj". An American fan of the group, Geoffery Treistadt from Minneapolis band Jonestown, released the Hermans' records simultaneously in North America on his tiny Project A Bomb label. Seeking wider distribution, the Hermans approached former Dead Kennedys singer Jello Biafra who released the Hermans' final studio and live albums on his Alternative Tentacles label before the group disbanded in 1995. About the break-up, Andy Morr later said, "As a four-piece band, we had said what we had to say." The Hermans gave their final three concerts in San Francisco in October 1995, having played nearly 450 gigs in their decade as a band.

Post-Hermans
Wilf Plum went to drum for the Canadian ensemble Rhythm Activism and the projects Two Pin Din and Orchestre Tout Puissant Marcel Duchamp. Andy Moor continues to play with The Ex as a permanent member, as well as numerous other projects. Colin McLean also toured with The Ex as the band's live sound engineer and played bass for their collaboration with Ethiopian saxophonist Getatchew Mekuria. Marion Coutts returned to the UK, dedicating herself to making and teaching visual art and writing books, with a few brief sojourns into playing and recording music. Sound engineer Gert Jan toured with The Ex for many years, as well as the bands Red Monkey and Zea.

Members
 Marion Coutts: vocals, trumpet, bells
 Colin Mclean: bass, guitar, steel drum
 Wilf Plum: drums, scrap metal, foghorn
 Andy Moor: guitar, viola, "hippo tube"
 Gert-Jan: live sound

Discography

Studio albums
 Humans Fly (12" EP, 1988, Calculus, UK)
 Everyday Timebomb (LP, 1989, Vinyl Drip, UK)
 Mental Blocks For All Ages (LP/CD, 1991, Konkurrel Records/Project A Bomb)
 Humans Fly / Everyday Timebomb (CD, 1991, Konkurrel Records)
 Hum of Life (LP/CD, 1993, Konkurrel Records/Project A Bomb)
 Those Deep Buds (LP/CD, 1994, Konkurrel Records/Alternative Tentacles)

Live albums
 Live Action & Increasing (Tape, 1988, Demon Radge, UK)
 Live at the "Ancienne Chocolaterie" (Tape, 1991, Demon Radge)
 Bump and Swing (CD, 1994, Konkurrel Records/Alternative Tentacles)

Singles
 "Unbend" (7", 1987, Demon Radge, UK)
 "Bella Ciao"/"Miss O'Grady" (7", 1988, Calculus, UK)
 "Too Much For The Red Ticker"/"Timebomb"(7", Konkurrent Records 1989)
 "Peace Warriors" (7", 1993, Compulsive, UK) split single with Jonestown

With The Ex
 "Lied der Steinklopfer" ("Stonestamper's Song") (7", 1990) released under the name Ex Faced Hermans
 Treat (split live cassette, 1990)
 Bimhuis 29/06/91 (2×7", part of The Ex's 6 series of singles released throughout 1991)

Compilation appearances
 "Balloon Girl" on Fridge Freezer 7” EP with the Turncoats, Sperm Wails & Membranes. (Ridiculous, Sharon! Records - SHAZ 001 - 1987)
 "Shat On By Angels" on Censorship Sucks LP (DDT Records - 1987)
 "How Much Vegetation Have You Got?" and "Miss O'Grady" on Menschen Fliegen LP (Constrictor Records CON! 00007 - 1988)
 "Yellow Girls" on Take 5 Shelter benefit LP (Shelter 4 - 1988)
 "Zig Zag Wanderer" on Fast ’N Bulbous Captain Beefheart covers LP (Imaginary Records ILLUSION 002 - 1988)
 "How Much Vegetation Have You Got?" on Gosh! CD (Constrictor, 1988)
 "John Henry" on Diamonds and Porcupines LP (Beat All The Tambourines TAMBEAT 3 - 1989)
 "Cactus" on A Pox upon the Poll Tax LP (1989)
 "Canzone Giuseppe Penelli" on Radio Mondain Den Haag De Sessies #1 cassette (Trespassers W Records TW1010 - 1991)
 "Draw the Curtain" on Es Gibt ein Leben vor dem Tod  LP (1992)
 "New Year" on The Dignity Of Human Being Is Vulnerable LP/CD (Konkeuurent/AWA, 1993)
 "Wings" and "Body Strategic" on Let's Make the Weiner Kid Sing 2xCD (various labels, 1993)
 "Viva" on King Konk: A Royal Compilation LP/CD (Konjurrel, 1994)
 "Fortune" on Attack of the Tentacles CD (Alternative Tentacles, 1995)
 "Blessed Are The Follies" on Upsalapalooza CD (WFMU, 1995)
 "Blessed Are The Follies" on Mordam Records Sampler #3 CD (Mordam Records, 1995)
 "Calley" on Sperminator CD (AWA, 1996)
 "The Women And Girls Go Dancing" on Up to D.A.T. CD (Mad's Collectif, 1997)
 "Incineration" on Commercially Unfriendsly CD (Gott Discs, 1005)
 "Balloon Girl" on Death to Trad Rock CD (Cherry Red, 2009)
 "Catbrain Walk" on C87'' 3xCD box set (Cherry Red, 2016)

See also
 The Ex
 Rhythm Activism
 Two Pin Din

References

External links
 Unofficial fansite including audio and lyrics

Scottish rock music groups
Scottish post-punk music groups
Anarcho-punk groups
Alternative Tentacles artists
Musical groups from Edinburgh